Bagh-e Olya (also Romanized as Bāgh-e ‘Olyā; also known as Bāgh-e Jāydar-e ‘Olyā) is a village in Jayedar Rural District, in the Central District of Pol-e Dokhtar County, Lorestan Province, Iran. At the 2006 census, its population was 189, in 41 families.

References 

Towns and villages in Pol-e Dokhtar County